The Marijuana Reform Party (abbreviated MRP) was a progressive minor political party in the U.S. state of New York dedicated to the legalization of cannabis. Founded in 1997, the Marijuana Reform Party ran a candidate for Governor of New York and other statewide offices in 1998 and 2002.

Gubernatorial tickets
1998 – Thomas K. Leighton and Jeffrey C. Wright
2002 – Thomas K. Leighton and Thomas J. Hillgardner

Election results

Results in New York City elections

Results in New York State elections

Results in federal elections

Competition with the Green Party
In 1998, gubernatorial candidate Tom Leighton accused the Green Party of New York of trying to have him removed several times from the November ballot by "challenging the validity of his petition signatures". The Board of Elections rejected the claim lodged by Richard Hirsh of the Green Party. Both parties, which appeal to liberal voters, competed for 50,000 votes required for an automatic ballot line on future ballots.  After both parties failed to obtain enough votes to gain a place on local and statewide ballots, Leighton stated that he had "no plans to try again next time."

See also
 Cannabis political parties of the United States

References

1997 in cannabis
Cannabis political parties of the United States
Political parties established in 1997
Political parties disestablished in 2004
Regional and state political parties in New York (state)